This article lists a selection of notable works created by August Macke. The listing follows the book August Macke, 1887-1914.

Paintings

Museums
Alte Nationalgalerie, Berlin
Berlin State Museums
Eskenazi Museum of Art, Bloomington, IN
Gelsenkirchen Art Museum
Germanisches Nationalmuseum, Nuremberg
Hessisches Landesmuseum Darmstadt
Kunsthalle Bremen
Kunsthalle Hamburg
Kunstsammlung Nordrhein-Westfalen, Düsseldorf
Kunsthaus Zürich
Kunstmuseum Bonn
Kunstmuseum Den Haag
Lenbachhaus, Munich
Museum Folkwang, Essen
:de:Museum für Neue Kunst (Freiburg im Breisgau)
Museum Kunstpalast, Düsseldorf
Museum Ludwig, Cologne
Museum Ostwall, Dortmund
Pinakothek der Moderne, Munich
Saarland Museum, Saarbrücken
Sprengel Museum, Hanover
Staatliche Kunsthalle Karlsruhe
Städel Museum, Frankfurt
Von der Heydt Museum, Wuppertal
Ulmer Museum
Westphalian State Museum of Art and Cultural History, Münster
:de:Wilhelm-Hack-Museum, Ludwigshafen

Media
Canvas
Cardboard
Card stock
Colourant
Gouache
Mischtechnik
Mural
Oil paint
Panel painting
Paper
Paperboard
Pencil
Plaster
Tempera
Watercolor painting
Watercolor paper

See also
Donkey Rider
Girls in Green
Indians on Horseback
Lady in Green Jacket
Landscape with Cows and Camel
Large Bright Showcase
People on the Blue Lake
Portrait with Apples
Promenade (Macke)
Woman with Umbrella in Front of a Hat Shop

Notes

References

External links

 
 

Macke
Macke
Macke